The Chieftains 6: Bonaparte's Retreat is an album by the Chieftains. It is their first album to include singing, featuring Dolores Keane. This album was the first time Kevin Conneff played on a Chieftains album, and was later to become a full member of the band.

Track listing
"The Chattering Magpie" – 4:47
"An Chéad Mháirt den Fhombar (The First Tuesday of Autumn) and Green Grow the Rushes O" – 3:12
"Bonaparte's Retreat" – 14:37
"Away with Ye" – 4:26
"Caledonia" – 5:28
"Iníon Nic Diarmada (Miss MacDermott) or The Princess Royal Máire Dhall (Blind Mary) and John Drury" – 7:00
"The Rights of Man" – 3:21
"Round the House and Mind the Dresser" – 3:12

Personnel
The Chieftains
Paddy Moloney - uillean pipes, tin whistle, bodhrán
Seán Potts - tin whistle, bodhrán
Martin Fay - fiddle
Michael Tubridy - flute, concertina, tin whistle
Derek Bell - harps, oboe, tiompán
Seán Keane - fiddle
Kevin Conneff - bodhrán
Dolores Keane - vocals

Sources and Links
 

The Chieftains albums
1976 albums
Claddagh Records albums